The men's fighting 94 kg competition in ju-jitsu at the 2017 World Games took place on 29 July 2017 at the GEM Sports Complex in Wrocław, Poland.

Results

Elimination round

Group A

Group B

Finals

References

Ju-jitsu at the 2017 World Games